Samuel Rutherford McWilliams (born September 4, 1995) is an American professional baseball pitcher who is currently a free agent.

Career

Amateur career
McWilliams attended Beech High School in Hendersonville, Tennessee, where he pitched for the school's baseball team. In 2014, his senior year, he was named to the All-State team by the Tennessee Sports Writers Association. He had committed to play college baseball for Tennessee Tech.

Philadelphia Phillies
The Philadelphia Phillies selected McWilliams in the eighth round of the 2014 MLB draft. He made his professional debut with the rookie ball GCL Phillies, pitching to a 5.40 ERA in 9 games. McWilliams made 7 appearances for the GCL Phillies in 2015, registering a 3.27 ERA in 33.0 innings of work.

Arizona Diamondbacks
On November 14, 2015, the Phillies traded McWilliams to the Arizona Diamondbacks in exchange for Jeremy Hellickson. He spent the 2016 season with the Kane County Cougars of the Class A Midwest League, and posted a 3–6 record and 3.98 ERA in 15 games. He returned to Kane County for the 2017 season, pitching to an 11–6 record and 2.84 ERA with 98 strikeouts in 133.0 innings pitched. He began the 2018 season with the Visalia Rawhide of the Class A-Advanced California League.

Tampa Bay Rays
On May 1, 2018, the Tampa Bay Rays acquired McWilliams and Colin Poche from the Diamondbacks as the players to be named later from the February trade in which the Diamondbacks acquired Steven Souza Jr. from the Rays. He finished the year split between the High-A Charlotte Stone Crabs and the Double-A Montgomery Biscuits, pitching to a 6–8 record with 101 strikeouts. The Kansas City Royals selected McWilliams in the 2018 Rule 5 draft. After pitching to a 15.43 ERA in  innings in spring training, the Royals returned McWilliams to the Rays on March 24, 2019. McWilliams split the 2019 season between Montgomery and the Triple-A Durham Bulls, posting a 7–9 record and 4.10 ERA in 26 games between the two teams. McWilliams did not play in a game in 2020 due to the cancellation of the minor league season because of the COVID-19 pandemic. On November 2, 2020, he elected free agency.

New York Mets
Due to changes McWilliams made to his mechanics and repertoire at Tampa Bay's alternate site during the 2020 season, roughly half the teams in Major League Baseball had inquired about signing him after he became a free agent. Ultimately, on November 20, 2020, McWilliams signed a one-year major league contract with the New York Mets for $750,000, far more than the Major League minimum despite never having pitched in a major league game. On May 31, 2021, McWilliams was designated for assignment by New York after struggling to a 10.80 ERA in 7 appearances for the Triple-A Syracuse Mets. McWilliams had not appeared in the majors for the Mets at the time of his designation.

San Diego Padres
On June 5, 2021, McWilliams was claimed off waivers by the San Diego Padres. On June 19, McWilliams was outrighted off of the 40-man roster without making a major league appearance. McWilliams elected free agency on October 6.

Cincinnati Reds
On March 19, 2022, McWilliams signed a minor league contract with the Cincinnati Reds. He was released on June 18, 2022.

See also
 Rule 5 draft results

References

External links

1995 births
Living people
People from Hendersonville, Tennessee
Baseball players from Orlando, Florida
Baseball pitchers
Florida Complex League Phillies players
Kane County Cougars players
Visalia Rawhide players
Charlotte Stone Crabs players
Montgomery Biscuits players
Durham Bulls players
Syracuse Mets players
El Paso Chihuahuas players